EUR Palasport is a station on Line B of the Rome Metro, in the EUR district of Rome between Viale America and Piazza Umberto Elia Terracini. It was opened in 1955 as EUR Marconi but renamed to its present name on the opening of the new Marconi station. Beside it is the artificial lake created for the 1960 Summer Olympics.

Surroundings 
PalaLottomatica
Laghetto dell'Eur

References

External links 

ATAC

Rome Metro Line B stations
Railway stations opened in 1955
1955 establishments in Italy
Rome Q. XXXII Europa
Railway stations in Italy opened in the 20th century